Eugen von Keyserling (22 March 1833 in Pockroy, Lithuania – 4 April 1889 in Dzierżoniów, Silesia) was a Baltic-German arachnologist.

He studied in the University of Tartu.

He was the author of Die Spinnen Amerikas, and completed Die Arachniden Australiens (1871–1883) on behalf of Ludwig Carl Christian Koch.

External links
 

German arachnologists
University of Tartu alumni
People from Pakruojis
Baltic-German people
1833 births
1889 deaths
19th-century German zoologists